The Expendables is a 2000 American made-for-television action film directed by Janet Meyers. It was written by Patricia Resnick, Peter Geiger and Bruno Heller. It stars Brett Cullen, Robin Givens, Idalis DeLeón and Tempestt Bledsoe. It aired April 25, 2000 on the USA Network.

Plot 

A group of female convicts volunteers for a mission to rescue a woman from a Cuban prison.

Cast 

 Brett Cullen as Deacon
 Robin Givens as Randy
 Idalis DeLeón as Ver
 Tempestt Bledsoe as Tanika
 Jenica Bergere as Sue
 Cristi Conaway as Nicoline
 Jennifer Blanc as Christine
 Julie Carmen as Jackie
 Megan Cavanagh as Prison Warden (as Megan Cavenagh)
 Thom Barry as Tyler
 Annette Helde as Rosa
 Eileen Weisinger as Anna (as Ayleen Weisinger)
 Wil Cesares as Jorge
 David Norona as Ramone
 Omar Ynigo as Maquito

References

External links
 

2000 television films
2000 films
2000 action films
American action films
Films set in prison
USA Network original films
Films with screenplays by Patricia Resnick
2000s American films